Hoss may refer to:

People
Hoss (surname), a list of people
Höss (surname), a German surname, including a list of people
Hoss (nickname), a list of people
"Blackjack" Hoss Taylor, a professional wrestler from NWA All-Star Wrestling

Fictional characters
Hoss Cartwright, in the television western Bonanza
Hoss Delgado, in the animated television series The Grim Adventures of Billy and Mandy
Harry Dresden, a detective in the series The Dresden Files
Hoss (comics), a Marvel Comics character

Music
HOSS Records, an American experimental independent record label formed in 2004
Hoss (band), a hard rock band
Hoss (album), Lagwagon's third album

Sport
Da Hoss, an American racehorse
Hoss, a professional wrestling term for a wrestler who is physically large and has an aggressive style.

Other uses
Hoss's Steak and Sea House, aka "Hoss's"